The Vermillion River Formation is a geological formation in Manitoba, Canada whose strata date back to the Late Cretaceous. Dinosaur remains are among the fossils that have been recovered from the formation.

Vertebrate paleofauna

See also

 List of dinosaur-bearing rock formations

References

Upper Cretaceous Series of North America